Hannah Kendall (born 1984 in London) is a British composer currently based in New York.

Background and career 
Kendall grew up in Wembley, where her mother is the head teacher in a primary school. One of two children, her parents are originally from Guyana. Her grandfather was a jazz musician and her family stimulated her interest in the creative arts. Kendall attended the University of Exeter where she majored in vocal studies and composition, studying with Joe Duddell. She also gained a Masters at the Royal College of Music, studying with Kenneth Hesketh, as well as arts management at the Royal Welsh College of Music and Drama.

In 2015, Kendall was noted as one of the "brilliant female composers under the age of 35". She featured on BBC Radio 3's Composer of the Week.  All five composers of the week were women and this was part of Radio 3's International Women's Day celebrations, which were highlighted in The Guardian. Also in 2015 Kendall won a 'Women of the Future Award' in the Arts and Culture category.

Her one-man chamber opera The Knife of Dawn, with a libretto by Tessa McWatt and based on the incarceration of political activist Martin Carter in  the then British Guiana in 1953 was premiered in 2016 at the Roundhouse.

Her piece The Spark Catchers premiered at the BBC Proms in August 2017 and is inspired by the work of poet Lemn Sissay. The performance was released on CD by NMC in January 2020. Kendall returned to the Proms for the delayed first night of live music (due to the pandemic) on 28 August 2020 with the world premiere of Tuxedo: Vasco 'de' Gama for orchestra, inspired by the work of the artist Jean-Michel Basquiat.

Kendall received the 2022 Hindemith Prize for music composition which is awarded to outstanding composers as part of the Schleswig-Holstein Musik Festival.

Kendall has worked for both the Barbican and London Music Masters charity in arts management roles. She is currently on the DMA (Doctor of Musical Arts) programme at Columbia University in New York as Dean's Fellow.

Selected works

Orchestral and large ensemble works 

 Citygates (2011) (large ensemble)
 Shard (2012)
 Kanashibari (2013) (inspired by the experience of sleep paralysis)
 The Great Dark (2013) (large ensemble)
 The Spark Catchers (2017)
 Baptistry (2018)
 Disillusioned Dreamer (2018)
 Verdala (2018) (large ensemble)
 weaves flowers and leaves (2019)
 Nexus (2020)
 Tuxedo: Vasco 'de' Gama (2020)

Chamber and solo works 

 Incident (text by Fleur Adcock) for soprano and piano
 Labyrinthine for two violins and two violas
 On the Chequer'd Field Array'd for piano
 Processional for piano
 The Unreturning (text by Wilfred Owen) for tenor and mixed ensemble

Choral works 
 Fundamental (text by Rick Holland) for chorus and brass quintet
 Regina Caeli for a cappella chorus

Operas 
 The Knife of Dawn (text by Tessa McWatt) for solo baritone, 2 sopranos, alto, violin, viola, cello and harp

References

External links 
 
 Performance of Tuxedo: Vasco ‘de’ Gama, BBC Proms, 28 August 2020

1984 births
Living people
Women classical composers
British classical composers
Alumni of the University of Exeter
Alumni of the Royal College of Music
Musicians from London
21st-century English women musicians
21st-century British composers
21st-century women composers
English people of Guyanese descent